Christian Schulz (born 1 April 1983) is a German former professional footballer who played as a centre back or left-back.

Club career 
Schulz joined Werder Bremen in 1995 at the age of twelve and stepped up to the reserve side, playing in the Regionalliga Nord in 2001–02. He made his Bundesliga debut on 15 February 2003 as a substitute against 1. FC Nürnberg. When Ümit Davala was injured, Schulz stepped in and made the left-back position his own. Wit Bremen he won the 2004 German football championship.

Although he had previously stated that he did not want to leave Bremen, he moved to Hannover 96 on 30 August 2007. After nine years with Hannover, he joined SK Sturm Graz. With Graz he won the 2017–18 Austrian Cup.

Schulz retired at the end of the 2020–21 season. Overall he played more than 400 matches in the German and Austrian top-flight respectively.

International career
Schulz earned four caps for the Germany national team, making his international debut on 16 December 2004 in a 3–0 friendly win over Japan.
 He was part of the DFB squad of the 2005 FIFA Confederations Cup on home soil but didn't take part in the tournament because of an injury.

Career statistics

Club

International

Honours
Werder Bremen
 Bundesliga: 2003–04, runner-up 2005–06
 DFB-Pokal: 2003–04
 DFB-Ligapokal: 2006, runner-up 2004

Sturm Graz
 Austrian Cup: 2017–18

References

External links

  
 

1983 births
Living people
People from Diepholz (district)
Footballers from Lower Saxony
German footballers
Germany international footballers
SV Werder Bremen players
SV Werder Bremen II players
Germany under-21 international footballers
Germany youth international footballers
Bundesliga players
Austrian Football Bundesliga players
Hannover 96 players
SK Sturm Graz players
Regionalliga players
2005 FIFA Confederations Cup players
Association football fullbacks
Association football central defenders
German expatriate footballers
Expatriate footballers in Austria
German expatriate sportspeople in Austria